Euphorbia franckiana is a species of flowering plant in the Euphorbiaceae family. It is a spurge native to southern Africa.  Phorbol has been isolated from the latex of this perennial plant.

References

franckiana
Taxa named by Alwin Berger